José Ricardo Gallardo Cardona  (born 18 November 1980) is a Mexican politician affiliated with the Ecologist Green Party of Mexico and current Governor of San Luis Potosí. He previously served as the mayor of Soledad de Graciano Sánchez and later as a deputy for San Luis Potosí.

References

1980 births
Living people
21st-century Mexican politicians
Ecologist Green Party of Mexico politicians
Governors of San Luis Potosí
Members of the Chamber of Deputies (Mexico)
Party of the Democratic Revolution politicians
Politicians from San Luis Potosí